Gregory Percy Jones  is an Alderman of the City of London Corporation, where he represents the ward of Farringdon Without. Jones had previously served as a Common Councilman for the same ward from March 2013 until his election as Alderman in February 2017. On both occasions, in keeping with City tradition, Jones stood as an Independent.  Gregory is a Liveryman of the Worshipful Company of Leathersellers where has served as steward and is currently 3rd Warden.  He is also a liveryman of the Worshipful Company of Butchers (Smithfield meat market is located in Farringdon Without).

Jones is a practicing barrister at the independent bar.  Jones is a member of Francis Taylor Building, Temple, London and an associate tenant of KBW Chambers in Leeds.  Described by Chambers and Partners as "The thinking man's QC." and as "Not just the meat-and-two-veg planning silk,  he can deal very comfortably with European issues and complexity across the board."  Jones specializes in town planning, infrastructure, environmental, EU, compulsory purchase, Parliamentary, education, administrative, local government and ecclesiastical law.  Jones has been called to the bars of both Northern Ireland and Ireland where he also practices as a member of both the Bar and Law libraries respectively.

Jones is the co-author of several leading texts including "The SEA Directive - A Plan for Success?" (Hart, 2017) Co-Edited Jones and Scotford; "The Habitats Directive - A Developer's Obstacle Course?" (Hart, 2012) Edited by Jones; "Statutory Nuisance Law and Practice" (3rd. Ed.) by McCracken, Jones, and Pereira (Bloomsbury, 2012) and "Environmental Law in Property Transactions" (4th. Ed.)(Bloomsbury, 2016) by Waite, Jones and Fogelmann'

Jones was educated at Colfe's School owned by the Leathersellers' Livery Company, and then at New College, Oxford (MA in jurisprudence) (President of the Oxford University Law Society, Treasurer of the Oxford Union and played for New College Rugby 1st XV) and University College (LLM). Jones was selected to tour the US in 1989 as part of the British National Debate Team organized by the English Speaking Union.  He was a stagiaire at the European Commission in 1990. Having taken his Bar finals at the Inns of Court School of Law whilst resident at the London House for Overseas Graduates (now called Goodenough College). Jones was called to the bar by Lincoln's Inn in 1991 taking silk in 2011. He is a Lincoln's Inn Hardwicke scholar and Thomas More Bursar; and Jean Pierre Warner scholar to the European Court of Justice (1995). Jones is a Bencher of Lincoln's Inn and also a Bencher of Inner Temple.  He is a Fellow of the Centre of European Law, King's College; Deputy Chancellor of the Dioceses of Exeter, Truro and Manchester and was a part-time Senior Lecturer at South Bank University (1993-1997). Jones is a member of the governing House Council of St. Stephen's House, Oxford University.

Jones served for five years as a governor of Colfe's School and then for seven years as governor of the Leathersellers' Federation of Schools (three state schools in Lewisham) and is President of the Sir John Staples Society which promotes cultural activities for the Federation schools. In 2015, Jones was appointed by the Irish government to chair an independent expert organizational review of An Bord Pleanála, the independent, statutory, quasi-judicial body responsible for strategic infrastructure and various environmental permitting decisions and all appeals from planning decisions made by local authorities in Ireland. The report   was published in February 2016 and made 101 recommendations. In 2018, Gregory was also appointed a governor of Goodenough College.  Gregory is a director of ''Eye Solar Ltd', a renewables energy company. Gregory has been appointed to the Court of the Honourable the Irish Society.

References 

Living people
Councilmen and Aldermen of the City of London
1968 births
British barristers
21st-century King's Counsel
People educated at Colfe's School
Alumni of New College, Oxford
Alumni of University College London